Sakuragi Station (桜木駅) is the name of two train stations in Japan:

Sakuragi Station (Chiba)
 Sakuragi Station (Shizuoka)